Flood Plain is a 1986 painting by the American artist Andrew Wyeth. It depicts a part of the artist's family's land in Chadds Ford, Pennsylvania in the winter, with patches of ice in the grass. In the foreground is a pile of hay with the remnants of an old hay wagon. Two icy wheel tracks lead to a mill and a granary in the background.

Creation
In his 1995 autobiography, Wyeth said about this painting that he "wanted to capture the clean-swept character of the beginning of the winter after the floods".

Provenance
The painting was acquired by the art dealer Frank E. Fowler and sold to the actor Charlton Heston in 1988. Heston was a friend and promoter of Wyeth and owned several of his paintings. In 1991 he received Wyeth's study for Flood Plain as a Christmas gift from the artist.

The painting was sold through Sotheby's in 2015 for 5,178,000 US dollars. The estimated value at the auction was 2,000,000—3,000,000 US dollars.

References

Further reading
 

1986 paintings
Paintings by Andrew Wyeth
Landscape paintings